Ahmed Faraj Abdullah Al-Rawahi (born 5 May 1994), commonly known as Ahmed Al-Rawahi, is an Omani footballer who plays for Al-Nasr Club in the Oman Professional League.

Club career

Al-Nasr
On 3 June 2017, Al-Rawahi extended his contract with Al-Nasr for another two seasons as the Salalah-based club showed faith in one of the country's finest keepers. Soon after the transfer of the club's and Oman national team's first choice keeper, Faiz Al-Rushaidi to Al-Suwaiq Club, Ahmed was promoted as the first choice keeper at Al-Nasr. The young keeper from Muscat did not disappoint and helped The King club win its 5th Sultan Qaboos Cup title defeating Sohar SC 6-5 on penalties after the match had ended 2-2 after extra time.

Before the beginning of the 2018-19 season, he also helped his side clinch their maiden Oman Super Cup title winning 4-2 on penalties against Al-Suwaiq after the match had ended 0-0 after normal time.

Honours

Club
Al-Seeb U-21
 Oman U-21 League (1): 2013-14

Al-Nasr
 Sultan Qaboos Cup (1): 2018
 Oman Professional League Cup (1): 2016-17
 Oman Super Cup (1): 2018

National Team
 Gulf Cup of Nations (1): 2017

International career
Ahmed is part of the first team squad of the Oman national football team. He was selected for the national team for the first time in 2018. He made his first appearance for Oman on 13 December 2018 in a friendly match against Tajikistan.

He was part of the Sultanate's squad for the 23rd Arabian Gulf Cup and helped his side win the title for only the second time in early 2018 defeating the United Arab Emirates in the final on penalties following a goalless draw.

References

External links
 
 Ahmed Al-Rawahi at Goal.com
 
 
 حارس النصر والمنتخب الوطني أحمد الرواحي: بدأت مهاجما ثـــم أصبحـــت حارســا  للمـرمــى at Al-Shabiba
 أحمد الرواحي حارس مرمى المنتخب الأولمبي: عازمون على رسم الابتسامة على الوجوه…! at koooorawabas.com

1994 births
Living people
People from Muscat, Oman
Omani footballers
Oman international footballers
Association football goalkeepers
2019 AFC Asian Cup players
Al-Nasr SC (Salalah) players
Oman Professional League players
Footballers at the 2014 Asian Games
Asian Games competitors for Oman